Man's Ruin Revisited is The Black League's third full-length album, released in 2004 by Spinefarm Records.

Track listing
"Old World Monkey"  (Jarva et al.) - 3:17
"Alive & Dead"  (Luttinen, Jarva et al.) - 3:17
"Cold Women and Warm Beer"  (Luttinen, Jarva et al.) - 4:40
"Hot Wheels"  (Aaltonen, Häkkinen, Stanley) - 2:41
"Black Water Forever"  (Jarva et al.) - 3:53
"Lost in the Shadows, I Walk Alone" (Luttinen, Jarva et al.) - 4:01
"Ain't No Friend o' Mine" (Valanne, Jarva et al.) - 3:05
"The Healer" (Luttinen, Jarva et al.) - 3:08
"Crooked Mile" (Luttinen, Jarva et al.) - 3:16
"Mad Ol' Country" (Valanne, Jarva et al.) - 4:03
"Man's Ruin... Revisited" (Laurila, Jarva et al.) - 2:51
"Better Angles (of Our Nature)" (Jarva et al.) - 6:44

All music and lyrics by The Leaguesmen except track 4 by Aaltonen/Häkkinen/Stanley.

Personnel
Taneli Jarva — vocals
Sir Luttinen — drums
Maike Valanne — guitars
Alexi Ranta — guitars
Mikko Laurila — bass guitar
Ultra Bimboos (Milla, Maria & Suffeli) — backing vocals (track 3)
Don Martinez & "the man"  — after party appearance (track 4)
Antti Litmanen  — lead guitar (track 12)
Chief "Guts" Leidén  — backing vocals (tracks 5,7,9,10,12)

2004 albums
The Black League albums